Kim Seung-ju (born December 31, 1995) is a South Korean football player who plays as a midfielder.

Career
Kim signed with USL Pro club Orange County Blues in April 2014.

References

1995 births
Living people
South Korean footballers
South Korean expatriate footballers
Orange County SC players
USL Championship players
Expatriate soccer players in the United States
South Korean expatriate sportspeople in the United States
Sportspeople from Busan
Association football midfielders